Tandonia sowerbyi is a species of air-breathing, keeled, land slug, a shell-less terrestrial gastropod mollusk in the family Milacidae.

Description
This is a keeled slug.

Habitat
This slug occurs in gardens and other synanthropic habitats.

Distribution
This slug is native to Europe, possibly originally only to Greece where it is very common. It is known to occur in a number of countries and islands including:
 Great Britain
 Ireland
 Italy
 Portugal
 Spain
 The Netherlands
 and other areas
And also in:
 New Zealand
 South America

This species has not yet become established in the USA, but it is considered to represent a potentially serious threat as a pest, an invasive species which could negatively affect agriculture, natural ecosystems, human health or commerce. Therefore it has been suggested that this species be given top national quarantine significance in the USA.

References

 AnimalBase info at: 
 Spencer, H.G., Marshall, B.A. & Willan, R.C. (2009). Checklist of New Zealand living Mollusca. pp 196–219 in Gordon, D.P. (ed.) New Zealand inventory of biodiversity. Volume one. Kingdom Animalia: Radiata, Lophotrochozoa, Deuterostomia. Canterbury University Press, Christchurch.

Milacidae
Gastropods described in 1823